The Ghana Taekwondo Federation is the largest taekwondo association in Ghana. It is a member of the Ghana Olympic Committee. It was originally called the Ghana Taekwondo Association.

The GTF organised the 2017 World Taekwondo Open Championship.

History

In the mid-1970s Bok Nam Kim, a Korean Taekwondo instructor was brought to Ghana to teach the sports in the Ghana Armed Forces but Taekwondo was accepted as an official sports by the National Sports Council in 1980 and the first ever tournament was held in 1981 at the Accra Sports Stadium.

References

External links
Official site

Sports organizations established in 1988
Taekwondo organizations
Taekwondo
National members of World Taekwondo
Taekwondo in Ghana
1988 establishments in Ghana
National Taekwondo teams